The Aubetin is a  long river in the Marne and Seine-et-Marne départements, northeastern France. It flows generally west-northwest.

Communes along its course
This list is ordered from source to mouth: 
Marne: Les Essarts-le-Vicomte, Bouchy-Saint-Genest, 
Seine-et-Marne: Louan-Villegruis-Fontaine, Villiers-Saint-Georges, Augers-en-Brie, Cerneux, Courtacon, Beton-Bazoches, Frétoy, Dagny, Amillis, Beautheil, Saints, Mauperthuis, Saint-Augustin, Pommeuse,

References

Rivers of France
Rivers of Marne (department)
Rivers of Seine-et-Marne
Rivers of Grand Est
Rivers of Île-de-France